Ilex machilifolia is a species of plant in the family Aquifoliaceae. It is endemic to Yunnan in southern China.

References

machilifolia
Endemic flora of China
Flora of Yunnan
Critically endangered flora of Asia
Taxonomy articles created by Polbot